The following is a list of notable events and releases of the year 1896 in Norwegian music.

Events

Deaths

Births

 March
 4 – Bjarne Brustad, composer, violinist and violist (died 1978).

 June
 2 – Arild Sandvold, organist, composer, and choir conductor (born 1984).

 July
 12 – Kirsten Flagstad, operatic soprano (died 1962).

 October 
 2 – Soffi Schønning, operatic soprano (died 1994).

See also
 1895 in Norway
 Music of Norway

References

 
Norwegian music
Norwegian
Music
1890s in Norwegian music